Ahron (Aaron) Soloveichik (May 1, 1917 – October 4, 2001) was a renowned Orthodox rosh yeshiva, and scholar of Talmud and halakha.

Biography

The youngest of five children, Rabbi Ahron Soloveichik was born to Moshe Soloveichik in Khislavichi, Russia, at which time his father was the rabbi of that town. Joseph Soloveitchik and Samuel Soloveichik were his older brothers.

His family first moved to Poland in 1920.  Before his father moved to New York in 1929, Moshe engaged his student Yitzchak Hutner to become Soloveichik's rebbe.  Soloveichik was Hutner's first student. Soloveichik celebrated his bar mitzvah in Warsaw, and then immigrated with his family to join his father in the United States in 1930. After he graduated from Yeshiva College, he went to law school at New York University and graduated with a law degree in 1946. He then spent the next 20 years teaching at yeshivas in New York City.

Soloveichik's first teaching position was in Mesivtha Tifereth Jerusalem then headed by Moshe Feinstein, from whom he received his semikhah (rabbinic ordination). Shortly thereafter Soloveichik was appointed by Yitzchak Hutner to give the highest daily lecture in Yeshiva Rabbi Chaim Berlin. Soloveichik's final position in New York was at Yeshiva University, where he instituted a popular weekly hashkafa class in addition to giving one of the advanced daily Talmud classes. It was during this time that Soloveichik was honored as Lecturer of the Year at Yeshiva University, the first rabbi to be so honored.

In 1966, he moved to Chicago to head the Hebrew Theological College in Skokie, Illinois. After differing with the administration there on certain key issues, he was let go in 1974 and opened his own yeshiva as the Rosh Yeshiva of Yeshivas Brisk (Brisk Rabbinical College) in Chicago, an American incarnation of the Brisk yeshivas and methods.

Soloveichik taught Torah for 58 years, the last 34 of which were in Chicago. He was well known for being a humble, kind man yet one with an iron will and unquestionable integrity. Although the stroke he suffered in 1983 left him partially paralyzed, in nearly-constant pain and often in need of a wheelchair, he continued his duties at Yeshivas Brisk in Chicago and flew to New York every week to deliver a Talmudic lecture at Yeshiva University (a position he accepted after his older brother became ill and was unable to continue lecturing).

His wife, Ella Shurin, was a writer and teacher. The couple raised six children all of whom are rabbis or women married to rabbis: Moshe Soloveichik of Chicago, USA; Eliyahu Soloveichik of New York City, USA; Yosef Soloveitchik of Jerusalem, Israel; Chaim Soloveichik of Ramat Beit Shemesh, Israel; Rochel Leah Marcus of Toronto, Ontario, Canada; and Tovah Segal of Newton, Massachusetts, USA.

He was buried beside his wife Ella and near his grandson Yisroel Yosef Soloveichik on the Mount of Olives in Jerusalem.
His grandchildren include Meir Soloveichik.

Works
Other works in Hebrew include commentaries on the works of Maimonides (Parach Mateh Aharon) and the laws of mourning (Od Yisrael Yosef Beni Chai) which was dedicated in memory of his grandson who died young after a long battle with cancer.

Additional works in English include Logic of the Heart Logic of the Mind - Wisdom and reflections on topics of our times.

Notes

Articles

 HaDarom, No. 22, Tisrei 5726 (Oct. 1955): בענין קידוש החודש
 HaDarom, No. 23, Nissan 5726 (April 1956): דין שימור במצות מצוה
 Bais Yitzchak, 1987: בענין יהרג ועל יעבור

External links
Famous Rabbis
My Grandfather, Rav Ahron by Nachama Soloveichik.
Rabbi Aaron Soloveichik (by Schulamith Halevy (he))
Filmed interview regarding anusim (March 23, 1998)
Rabbi Soloveichik responsum to Schulamith Halevy (he) PDF

Soloveitchik rabbinic dynasty
1917 births
2001 deaths
American Orthodox rabbis
Rosh yeshivas
Orthodox rabbis from Russia
Lithuanian Orthodox rabbis
Yeshiva University rosh yeshivas
20th-century Lithuanian rabbis
Burials at the Jewish cemetery on the Mount of Olives
Rabbis from Chicago